Coleophora swatensis is a moth of the family Coleophoridae. It is found in Afghanistan, Pakistan and Iran.

References

swatensis
Moths of Asia
Moths described in 1994